Captain Jillian "Cowgirl" Pearlman, USAF, is a fictional character in the . She was created by writer Geoff Johns and artist Carlos Pacheco as a rival to Carol Ferris for the romantic affections of Hal Jordan. Pearlman's original design in the comics was based on actress Kirsten Dunst.

Publication history
Created by Geoff Johns and Carlos Pacheco, Jillian Pearlman first appeared in Green Lantern vol. 4, #1 in 2005.

Fictional character biography
The fourth child of a Texan rancher, Jillian enlists in the United States Air Force after she turns nineteen. Her sharp wit, attitude, and Texan accent earn her the call sign "Cowgirl". Jillian meets Hal Jordan's alter-ego, Green Lantern, after he saves her life when the engine of her jet, an X-2020, is failing and later meets Jordan face to face at Edwards Air Force Base. Jordan and Jillian feel a romantic attraction to each other, and eventually realize that they have a lot in common.

During the lost year, Cowgirl, Hal "Highball" Jordan, and Shane "Rocket-Man" Sellers are sent on an Air Force mission, on which Jordan, per usual, does not wear his Green Lantern ring. During the mission, all three of their jets are shot down and the pilots taken as prisoners of war. Jordan files down his chains in an attempt to escape the camp, finally doing so when his captors attempt to torture Cowgirl in front of him to get him to reveal secrets, since torturing Jordan himself was not working. Cowgirl and Jordan use the surprise to overcome their jailers, locate Rocket-Man, and flee the camp,. They eventually make it to a campsite and a hospital. Upon their return to America they are awarded POW medals in a ceremony interrupted by a ship piloted by Tomar-Tu crashing to Earth. When the three recovered POWs are put back on active Air Force duty, it is done so on the condition that they attend therapy sessions. All three skip the sessions, deciding instead to get together at Pancho's, the station bar, and work through it.

Just 24 hours after being re-activated, Cowgirl is sent on a mission alongside pilots to take down the same group of terrorists that took her captive. During the mission her jet is hit and the Air Force loses contact, causing Jordan to go after her in his Green Lantern guise when he finds out. When he makes it to the crash site and nearby camp, there is no sign of her, the terrorists having immediately taken off with her in a jeep when they realize the Green Lantern was coming. Cowgirl yanks the steering wheel, sending the jeep into a tree and herself into a frozen lake, from which she is saved by Hal Jordan, whom she recognizes beneath the mask. As he attempts to heal her with his power ring numerous bounty hunters attack him. John Stewart, undercover as bounty hunter, "captures" him and deposits Cowgirl in a hospital.

When the Star Sapphire gem resurfaces, hosted by Carol Ferris, it attacks Cowgirl at Pancho's to get to Jordan before realizing that Jordan has feelings for her. The Star Sapphire jumps hosts to Cowgirl and chases Jordan, carrying Ferris, through the city as he tries to tire her out, eventually knocking him into a "Honeymoon Hotel". Jordan covers Ferris with a Green Lantern "suit" and the two battle Pearlman. Jordan finally pinning Cowgirl under a car and prying the Sapphire off of her. Four Zamarons step out of the portal, and declare that both Cowgirl and Ferris will become the first two members of their Corps.

Jordan tells Ferris to attempt to remove the Star Sapphire from Cowgirl while he confronts the Zamarons. Though she is able to do so, the stone immobilizes both her and Cowgirl while the Zamarons gain the upper hand over Jordan. The stone asks Jordan which of the two women he desires the most, as the one he chooses will be able to be with him forever. In response, Jordan kisses one of the Zamarons. This convinces the stone to release its hostages and possess the Zamaron Jordan kissed instead. The stone reacts with its new host violently, prompting the Zamarons to retreat to their home planet.

Pearlman appears at the beginning of the 2009's crossover Blackest Night storyline, performing a "fly-by" with the Green Lanterns of Earth for Coast City's "memorial day".

After the events of DC Rebirth (2011), Pearlman is reintroduced in continuity on Grant Morrison's run for DC Retroactive, a collection of independent stories set in the 70s, 80s and 90s.

References

External links
Jillian "Cowgirl" Pearlman comicbookdb

DC Comics female characters
Fictional fighter pilots
Fictional female aviators
Fictional characters from Texas
Comics characters introduced in 2005
Characters created by Geoff Johns
Fictional United States Air Force personnel
Fictional female captains
Fictional military captains